Innovations in Systems and Software Engineering: A NASA Journal is a peer-reviewed scientific journal of computer science covering systems and software engineering, including formal methods. It is published by Springer Science+Business Media on behalf of NASA. The editors-in-chief are Michael Hinchey (University of Limerick) and Shawn Bohner (Rose-Hulman Institute of Technology).

Abstracting and indexing
The journal is abstracted and indexed in:

References

External links
 

Publications established in 2005
Computer science journals
Systems engineering
Software engineering publications
Springer Science+Business Media academic journals
Formal methods publications
Quarterly journals
NASA mass media
Hybrid open access journals